Károly Várszegi (25 January 1943 in Budapest, Hungary – 26 March 1999) was a Hungarian director and cinematographer, who was awarded with the Balázs Béla Award.

Life
His father was Károly Várszegi and his mother was Mária Lowak. Between 1963. and 1967 he worked for the Magyar Televízió as a semi-cinematographer. In 1967 he got the chance to make his first own films as a cinematographer.

Other awards
 First prize of the Festival of Miskolc (1976, 1977)

Sources
 Hermann Péter: Magyar és Nemzetközi Ki Kicsoda 1998 CD-ROM, Biográf Kiadó, Budapest, 1997 

1943 births
1999 deaths
Hungarian cinematographers
Hungarian film directors